HELP.gv.at is a multi-agency platform of the Austrian Federal Administration, developed by the Austrian Federal Computing Centre. HELP.gv.at was launched in 1997 as an information platform about administrative procedures for citizens and since then has changed into one of the most important hubs of e-administration in Austria.

External links 
 Link to HELP.gv.at
 Website of the Austrian Federal Computing Centre

Information technology in Austria